Shelby Tracy Tom (1963May 27, 2003) was a Canadian transgender woman who was strangled to death in North Vancouver, British Columbia, after 29-year-old Jatin Patel discovered that Tom was transgender during a sexual encounter.

Personal life

Tom lived in Vancouver, British Columbia where she was working as a sex worker in Vancouver's Downtown Eastside. Tom's friends and those who knew her best described her as a breathtaking beauty who was generous, genuine, respectful to everyone she met, and loved her life and her friends.

Tom was often helping those who were underprivileged in the Downtown Eastside and had completed a degree in History from Simon Fraser University the same year of her murder, in hopes of leaving her job as a sex worker and becoming a social worker to help others in the transgender community. Tom's family supported her and loved her deeply.

Murder

On May 27, 2003, Jatin Patel—a man who had recently been deported from the United States after serving a 60-month jail sentence for theft—met Tom at a nightclub in Vancouver's Downtown Eastside where Patel stated that he would pay Tom $400 for sex. The two then relocated to Room 214 at the Travelodge Hotel in North Vancouver. While performing oral sex on her, Patel became aware of scarring on Tom's body that he recognized to be from gender confirmation surgery and became enraged, strangling Tom to death.

Patel proceeded to hide Tom's body inside of a closet while he went to find another woman to have sexual relations with. When they arrived back to the hotel, Patel told the second woman that he was considering disposing of Tom's body by throwing it in the ocean, burning it, or chopping it up. Tom's body remained in the closet for 3 days until Patel wrapped her body in a mattress cover and left it in a shopping cart behind a dry cleaning establishment nearby. Tom's body was found on May 31, 2003, four days after her murder.

Trial and controversy
On July 26, 2005, BC Supreme Court Justice Patrick Dohm rejected the application that Tom's murder was a hate crime under the premise that Patel did not intentionally target Tom because of her gender identity, because Patel did not know that Tom identified as a transgender woman when they initially met. This resulted in anger and outrage from the many who believe that this crime was committed with a bias that resulted entirely because of Tom's gender identity and status as a sex worker.

Patel's defense argued that Patel's encounter with Tom caused him to feel rage, betrayal, and personal violation, which ultimately caused him to suffer from posttraumatic stress disorder. The defense also stated that Patel had been sexually assaulted during his sentences over the past 14 years in different U.S. jails, which explained his raging reaction to Tom.

Patel's defense issued a plea bargain for his charge to be dropped from second-degree murder down to manslaughter. This request was approved and Patel was sentenced to a total of 9 years in prison. However, in 2009, after a total of 4 years of jail time, Patel was released from jail and relocated to a halfway house, after he was granted double-time credit for the time he previously served in jail following Tom's murder. Patel was later taken back into police custody after failing to return to the halfway house before curfew. Police suspect Patel was on the Downtown Eastside around other sex workers.

Remembrance
Tom's murder resulted in a great upset for the transgender community and its alliances. A candlelight vigil was held in Tom's honour in Vancouver in June 2013.

See also

References

2003 in LGBT history
2003 murders in Canada
Murder in Canada
Violence against trans women
LGBT history in Canada
Culture-related controversies
Deaths by strangulation
Women in British Columbia
LGBT in British Columbia